James Franklin Sirmons (December 16, 1917 – April 20, 2018) was an American broadcasting executive who worked for CBS from 1942 to 2000, first in Radio Operations and later in Labor / Industrial Relations.

Early life
Sirmons was born December 16, 1917, in Saint Petersburg, Florida, to Benjamin Franklin Sirmons and Pearl Estelle Barfield. He attended St. Petersburg College (then called St. Petersburg Junior College) in Saint Petersburg, Florida in 1935-1937 and then the University of Florida in Gainesville, Florida in 1937-1941 studying law.

Early career
In early 1940 he accepted his first job at CBS affiliate WCKY in Cincinnati, Ohio working on a morning radio show called The Hot Coffee Club. Soon afterward, in late 1940 he joined WFMJ in Youngstown, Ohio as an announcer and production manager. He met his future wife, Virginia Gorgas, while working there. "James Sirmons, chief announcer of WFMJ, Youngstown, recently married Virginia Gorgas, whom he meet when she entered the television contest staged during the RCA television show in Youngstown last April. Miss Gorgas, however, failed to win a contest prize."

CBS Radio Network 
In early 1942 there was an opening for a Production Supervisor for the CBS Radio Network in New York City. Newly married, and with the U.S. entering World War II, he accepted the night shift and managed announcers, directors, musicians and other crew and talent for live radio broadcasts. He worked closely with CBS co-founder and president Dr. Frank Stanton as well as vice president of CBS News Edward R. Murrow, chief of CBS News Wells "Ted" Church, and broadcast journalists such as Eric Sevareid, John Charles Daly, George Herman, Richard C. Hottelet, William L. Shirer, Theodore "Ted" Koop, and Lowell Thomas. He helped to manage the live report on D-Day on June 6, 1944, and the first live televised presidential election in progress (Truman vs Dewey, November 3, 1948).

In 1949 he was promoted to Operations Manager. During these years he also taught broadcasting courses at NYU. One of his students, Larry King, accredited Sirmons as one of the people who helped set him on the right path to becoming a broadcaster.

Industrial Relations 
In 1957, Sirmons was promoted to Assistant Director of Labor Relations at CBS, reporting to the first vice president of that department, William C. Fitts. He was then promoted in 1961 to Director of Labor Relations.

Upon the retirement of Mr. Fitts in 1969, Sirmons was promoted to Vice President of Employee Relations, and then in 1971 became Vice President of Personnel and Labor Relations at CBS.

In 1981 he was promoted to Senior Vice President of Industrial Relations, and finally in 1994 promoted to Executive Vice President of Industrial Relations.

By the time of his retirement in 2000 he had worked for 58 years at CBS and was responsible for over 200 labor agreements in broadcasting.

AFTRA Health & Retirement Funds 
 In 1968, Sirmons was elected to the Board of Directors at AFTRA Health & Retirement Funds, and in 1970 was elected chairman, a position he held until 2001 when he finally resigned as chairman. He resigned the board in 2009. During his 48 year tenure he negotiated 61 contracts with AFTRA.

Death 
James F. Sirmons died peacefully in his home in St. Petersburg, Florida on April 20, 2018 at 100 years, 4 months and 4 days old.

Accolades 
 1973: Merit Award, United Fund of Greater New York
 American Broadcast Pioneer, Broadcasters' Foundation of America
 2008: Outstanding Alumnus Award, St. Petersburg College Alumni Association, Inc.

References

Further reading 
 Koenix, Allen Edward. American Federation of Television and Radio Artists Negotiations and Contracts (1962).

1917 births
2018 deaths
CBS executives
American centenarians
Men centenarians
People from St. Petersburg, Florida